In mathematical logic, the cut rule is an inference rule of sequent calculus. It is a generalisation of the classical modus ponens inference rule.  Its meaning is that, if a formula A appears as a conclusion in one proof and a hypothesis in another, then another proof in which the formula A does not appear can be deduced.  In the particular case of the modus ponens, for example occurrences of man are eliminated of Every man is mortal, Socrates is a man to deduce Socrates is mortal.

Formal notation 
Formal notation in sequent calculus notation :
cut

Elimination 
The cut rule is the subject of an important theorem, the cut elimination theorem. It states that any judgement that possesses a proof in the sequent calculus that makes use of the cut rule also possesses a cut-free proof, that is, a proof that does not make use of the cut rule.

Rules of inference
Logical calculi